The Schroon River is a  tributary of the Hudson River in the southern Adirondack Mountains of New York, beginning at the confluence of Crowfoot Brook and New Pond Brook near Underwood, and terminating at the Hudson in Warrensburg. Its watershed is entirely within the Adirondack Park. The river runs through the towns of North Hudson, Schroon, Chester, Bolton, and Warrensburg.

Interstate 87, the Adirondack Northway, follows the Schroon River valley from Warrensburg to Underwood. U.S. Route 9 takes a parallel course from Warrensburg to Schroon Lake, then follows the river through Underwood.

See also
List of rivers in New York

References

External links 

Adirondacks
Rivers of New York (state)
Rivers of Essex County, New York
Rivers of Warren County, New York
Tributaries of the Hudson River